St. Pancras Building Society was a UK building society, which merged with the Portman Building Society in 1993. The Portman then merged with the Nationwide Building Society in 2007.

References

External links
Nationwide Building Society website